The Sunjiawan mine disaster was a mine disaster that occurred on 14 February 2005 in Fuxin city, Liaoning province, in the northeastern part of the People's Republic of China. Initial reports indicated that at least 214 coal miners were killed, making it the worst mining disaster in China in at least 15 years.

The disaster was a gas explosion that occurred about 3:50 p.m. local time at the Sunjiawan colliery of the Fuxin Coal Industry Group in the city of Fuxin, about 242m (794 feet) underground. Twenty-two people were injured. The explosion reportedly occurred about ten minutes after an earthquake shook the mine.

See also

Coal power in China
List of explosions

References

Sunjiawan mine disaster
2005 disasters in China
History of Liaoning
Coal mining disasters in China